David José Gomes Oliveira Tavares (born 18 March 1999) is a Portuguese professional footballer who plays for F.C. Famalicão as a midfielder.

Club career

Benfica
Born in Lisbon of Cape Verdean descent, Tavares finished his youth career with S.L. Benfica after arriving from neighbours Sporting CP at the age of 17. He made his senior debut with the former's reserves in the LigaPro, his first match being on 16 March 2019 when he came on an 89th-minute substitute in a 2–1 home win against F.C. Penafiel.

Tavares made the first of two competitive appearances with the first team on 17 September 2019, replacing Jota midway through the second half of an eventual 1–2 home loss to RB Leipzig in the group stage of the UEFA Champions League. In September 2020 he joined Moreirense F.C. of the Primeira Liga in a season-long loan, playing his first game in the competition on 2 October in the 1–1 home draw with Boavista FC.

On 26 January 2021, Tavares was reinstated in the B side of his parent club, leaving Moreirense after allegedly falling out with manager Vasco Seabra.

Famalicão
On 29 June 2021, Tavares signed a five-year contract with F.C. Famalicão. He suffered a serious injury in December that sidelined him for several months, while in service of the under-23 side to where he had been sent due to disciplinary problems.

Career statistics

Club

Honours
Benfica
UEFA Youth League runner-up: 2016–17

References

External links

1999 births
Living people
Portuguese sportspeople of Cape Verdean descent
Black Portuguese sportspeople
Portuguese footballers
Footballers from Lisbon
Association football midfielders
Primeira Liga players
Liga Portugal 2 players
S.L. Benfica B players
S.L. Benfica footballers
Moreirense F.C. players
F.C. Famalicão players
Portugal youth international footballers